William Mortimer may refer to:

 William Mortimer (rugby union) (1874–1916), English rugby union forward
 William Mortimer (architect) ((1841/42–1913), English architect
 William Mortimer (cricketer) (1833–1916), English cricketer and British Army officer
 William James Mortimer (died 2010), publisher, president and editor of the Deseret News
 William Chapman Mortimer (1907–1988), Scottish novelist